Face to Face is a 1951 British TV movie starring Diana Dors. It was performed live on the BBC on 30 January 1951 and was the first TV role for Dors. It was written by Emery Bonnett.

Plot
Angel, a young stage performer in a song and dance act, falls in love with a rich older businessman. This upsets the businessman’s grown-up children.

Cast
Norman Tyrell as an author
Diana Dors as Angel
Robert Ayres as Craig Brown
John Baker as A doorman
John Gatrell as Vincent Granam
Sarah Lawson (actress) as Myrtle Beringer
Thea Holme as Grace Hassett
Sonia Moray as A telegraph girl
Elizabeth Gray as Serena Pentonville
John Benson as Richard Beringer
Claude Bonser as Blake
Julian D’Albie as Arthur Beringer

References

External links
Face to Face at IMDb
Face to Face at BFI

1951 television films
1951 films
British television films